This is a list of wars involving the State of Palestine.

See also 

 List of wars involving Israel
 List of modern conflicts in the Middle East

References 

 
Palestine